Calvin Coolidge Julius Caesar Tuskahoma McLish (December 1, 1925 – August 26, 2010), nicknamed "Bus", was an American professional baseball pitcher and coach, who played in Major League Baseball (MLB) for the Brooklyn Dodgers, Pittsburgh Pirates (–), Chicago Cubs, Cleveland Indians (–), Cincinnati Reds, Chicago White Sox, and Philadelphia Phillies (–). He was a switch-hitter and threw right-handed.

In a 15-season career, McLish posted a 92–92 win–loss record, with 713 strikeouts, and a 4.01 earned run average (ERA), in 1,609 innings pitched.

Background
McLish was born in Anadarko, Oklahoma, on December 1, 1925. McLish's parents were John and Lula McLish. His father was three-quarters Cherokee Indian. He was the seventh of eight children. He was named for Calvin Coolidge, Julius Caesar, and Tuskahoma, Oklahoma. He stated that the origin of his lengthy name is that his father was given permission to name the newborn, after not getting to name his previous six children, and he took full advantage of the opportunity. He was raised in Oklahoma City, and went to its Central High School (Oklahoma City, Oklahoma).

Playing career
McLish signed with the Brooklyn Dodgers before the 1944 season. He made his Major League Baseball debut with the Dodgers that year, the first time he played organized baseball. He spent 1945 in the United States Army, and was deployed in the Western Front of World War II. He returned to baseball in 1946, playing for the Dodgers.

On May 3, 1947, the Dodgers traded McLish, Hank Behrman, Kirby Higbe, Dixie Howell, and Gene Mauch to the Pittsburgh Pirates for Al Gionfriddo and $100,000 ($ in current dollar terms). In addition to pitching for Pittsburgh in 1948, he also pitched for the Indianapolis Indians of the Class AAA American Association (AA). With McLish, the Indians won the AA pennant. After the 1948 season, the Pirates traded McLish and Frankie Gustine to the Chicago Cubs for Cliff Chambers and Clyde McCullough. He played in the minor leagues for the Los Angeles Angels of the Class AAA Pacific Coast League (PCL) in 1949.

McLish won 20 games for the Angels during the 1950 season. The Cubs sold McLish to the San Diego Padres, also in the PCL, in 1955. In 1956, McLish returned to MLB, pitching for the Cleveland Indians. He had a 16-8 win–loss record for Cleveland during the 1958 season, with a 2.99 earned run average (ERA). In the 1958 and 1959 seasons, McLish set a major league record with 16 consecutive wins in road games. This was later surpassed by Greg Maddux. In 1959, McLish had a 19–8 win–loss record with a 3.62 earned run average. He appeared in the 1959 MLB All-Star Game, earning the save for the American League. Despite having a chance for his 20th win, Indians management asked McLish to forgo his final start of the season so that Herb Score could pitch, as he returned from injury.

After the 1959 season, the Indians traded McLish with Gordy Coleman and Billy Martin to the Cincinnati Redlegs for Johnny Temple. Disappointed by the trade, McLish said that Indians' general manager Frank Lane "never did like me". McLish played for the Redlegs in 1960. After the season, they traded McLish and Juan Pizarro to the Chicago White Sox for Gene Freese. Before the 1962 season, the White Sox sent McLish to the Philadelphia Phillies when Andy Carey, who they had traded to Philadelphia, refused to report. Carey instead went to the Dodgers, and McLish was sent to the Phillies. In 1963, McLish had a 13–11 win–loss record in 211 innings pitched, the most on the team. He suffered from an injured shoulder the next season, and the Phillies released McLish in July 1964.

McLish also pitched for the Leones del Caracas of the Venezuelan Professional Baseball League, posting a 14–12 record with a 2.69 ERA and 147 strikeouts in parts of two seasons spanning 1953–1956. He also helped himself with the bat, hitting .358 (54-for-151) with three home runs and 14 runs batted in, being used occasionally as a pinch hitter.

Coaching and scouting career
After his playing career, McLish became a major league pitching coach for the Phillies, under Mauch, the Phillies' manager. He coached for the Phillies in 1965 and 1966, and then spent the next two years scouting for the Phillies. He then followed Mauch to the expansion Montreal Expos in 1969, where he served as pitching coach and developed pitchers Bill Stoneman, Carl Morton, Steve Renko, and Ernie McAnally. He was ill in 1973 with bronchial pneumonia, and team doctors sent him home to recuperate.

The Expos fired Mauch and McLish after the 1975 season. He was soon thereafter hired to coach the Milwaukee Brewers. He coached the Brewers from 1976 through 1982. He then served as a scout for the Brewers. He worked in professional baseball through 2005, when he was an instructor for the Seattle Mariners.

Personal life
McLish was inducted to the Oklahoma Sports Hall of Fame in 2009.

McLish and his wife, Ruth, were married for 60 years. He had a daughter, three sons, and thirteen grandchildren. McLish died of leukemia at his home in Edmond, Oklahoma.

See also

List of baseball players who went directly to Major League Baseball

References

External links

Cal McLish at SABR (Baseball BioProject)
Cal McLish at Baseball Almanac
Cal McLish at Baseball Library
Cal McLish at Pura Pelota (Venezuelan Professional Baseball League)

Cal McLish Oral History Interview (1 of 4) - National Baseball Hall of Fame Digital Collection
Cal McLish Oral History Interview (2 of 4) - National Baseball Hall of Fame Digital Collection
Cal McLish Oral History Interview (3 of 4) - National Baseball Hall of Fame Digital Collection
Cal McLish Oral History Interview (4 of 4) - National Baseball Hall of Fame Digital Collection

 
 

1925 births
2010 deaths
American League All-Stars
United States Army personnel of World War II
Baseball players from Oklahoma
Brooklyn Dodgers players
Chicago Cubs players
Chicago White Sox players
Choctaw people
Cincinnati Reds players
Cleveland Indians players
Deaths from cancer in Oklahoma
Deaths from leukemia
Indianapolis Indians players
Kansas City Blues (baseball) players
Leones del Caracas players
American expatriate baseball players in Venezuela
Los Angeles Angels (minor league) players
Major League Baseball pitchers
Major League Baseball pitching coaches
Milwaukee Brewers coaches
Milwaukee Brewers scouts
Montreal Expos coaches
People from Anadarko, Oklahoma
Philadelphia Phillies coaches
Philadelphia Phillies players
Philadelphia Phillies scouts
Pittsburgh Pirates players
San Diego Padres (minor league) players
Sportspeople from Edmond, Oklahoma
United States Army soldiers
20th-century Native Americans
21st-century Native Americans